Elmalı is a village in the Bulancak district of Giresun Province. Its population is 476 (2021).

History 
The name of the village is mentioned as Elmalu in the records of 1455.

Geography  
The village is 51 km from Giresun city center and 36 km from Bulancak district center. The village is in the southwest of Bulancak and is connected to the Bulancak-Kovanlık-Aydındere provincial road by a 5.7 km long village road.

Population

References 

Villages in Bulancak District